Christopher John David Wray (8 March 1940 – 12 September 2014) was an English actor and businessman.

Early life and education
He was born in Scarborough, North Yorkshire, North Riding of Yorkshire, and educated at Abingdon School in Abingdon-on-Thames, Oxfordshire, from 1951-1957. He was a keen actor at the school appearing in the School Productions, which included playing Bob Acres in The Rivals during 1956.

Career
In the late 1950s he trained as an actor at the Italia Conti Academy of Theatre Arts in London and for the next few years found roles in British television productions such as Lowe in the episode "I Dies from Love" in Upstairs, Downstairs, Seaman Lovell and PC Groom in Doctor Who, PC Anderson in Z-Cars and PC Ball in Emmerdale.

During the actors’ strike in the early 1960s he started selling old lamps in the Chelsea Antiques Market, and this developed into a lighting business with a shop on the King's Road in London known as the Christopher Wray Lighting Emporium. This became the flagship store of a business with around 20 shops in other towns and cities, including the Christopher Wray Lighting works in Birmingham.

The lighting business became so successful that he gave up on his acting career early in the 1970s following appearances in Emmerdale and The Adventures of Black Beauty in 1973.

See also
 List of Old Abingdonians

References

External links

English male soap opera actors
English male film actors
English male stage actors
1940 births
2014 deaths
Actors from Scarborough, North Yorkshire
People educated at Abingdon School
Alumni of the Italia Conti Academy of Theatre Arts